Baruunturuun is a sum in Uvs Province of Mongolia.

It is the heartland of grain production in the province, and lies on the bank of the Turuun River. The sum is also one of the most populous areas in the province. MIAT Mongolian Airlines flew to Baruunturuun directly from Ulan Bator until 2005, but stopped due to a plane shortage. Although the Baruunturuun Airport is not operational at the moment, it is considered the secondary airport of the province.

Climate
Baruunturuun has a continental climate (Köppen climate classification Dwb) closely bordering on a subarctic climate (Köppen climate classification Dwc) with warm summers and bitterly cold winters even for Mongolia, owing to very strong altitudinal temperature inversions from drainage of cold air into the western valleys. Much precipitation falls in the summer as rain, with some snow in the spring and autumn. Winters are quite dry, with only light snowfall.

References

Populated places in Mongolia
Districts of Uvs Province